Jeremy de Nooijer (born 15 March 1992, in Vlissingen) is a Dutch-born Curaçaoan international footballer who plays as a midfielder for Qatari club Al-Shamal SC. He is the son of former footballer Dennis de Nooijer, the nephew of Gérard de Nooijer and the cousin of Bradley de Nooijer.

Career
In September 2011, De Nooijer received his first call into the Sparta Rotterdam senior squad, when he was an unused substitute for a 1–0 Eerste Divisie win over Den Bosch. He made his competitive debut in a 2–1 league defeat to Veendam on 21 December 2012. De Nooijer scored his first Sparta goal against Den Bosch in a 7–1 win on 26 October 2013. He left Sparta at the end of the 2014–15 campaign making a total of 62 league appearances, scoring two goals.

On 29 June 2015, De Nooijer signed a two-year contract with Bulgarian side Levski Sofia. He made his A Group debut in a 1–1 away draw against Botev Plovdiv on 18 July. He left in May 2017 after his contract was not renewed.

On 5 March 2019, de Nooijer joined Lithuanian club FK Sūduva Marijampolė. He played eight league games for the club, before his contract was terminated by mutual consent on 15 May 2019.

In June 2019, de Nooijer signed a one-year contract with Qatari club Al-Shamal SC, with an option for another year.

Statistics
As of 20 December 2015

Honours

International
Curaçao
 Caribbean Cup: 2017

References

External links
 Voetbal International profile 
 Profile at LevskiSofia.info

1992 births
Living people
Curaçao footballers
Curaçao international footballers
Dutch footballers
Sparta Rotterdam players
PFC Levski Sofia players
FC Sheriff Tiraspol players
FK Sūduva Marijampolė players
Al-Shamal SC players
Eerste Divisie players
First Professional Football League (Bulgaria) players
Moldovan Super Liga players
A Lyga players
Qatari Second Division players
Qatar Stars League players
Association football midfielders
Sportspeople from Vlissingen
Footballers from Zeeland
Dutch expatriate footballers
Curaçao expatriate footballers
Expatriate footballers in Bulgaria
Expatriate footballers in Moldova
Expatriate footballers in Lithuania
Expatriate footballers in Qatar
Dutch expatriate sportspeople in Bulgaria
Dutch expatriate sportspeople in Moldova
Dutch expatriate sportspeople in Lithuania
Dutch expatriate sportspeople in Qatar